Thanatopsis is an experimental short film by Ed Emshwiller, produced in 1962.

Description
Thanatopsis features images of a motionless man (Mac Emshwiller) and an indistinct dancing woman (Becky Arnold). The film's soundtrack includes a heartbeat and a hacksaw. The title is from the Greek thanatos ("death") and -opsis ("sight"), the word often translated to mean "meditation on death". Thanatopsis is one of several Emshwiller films to feature dance passages, with others including Lifelines, Dance Chromatic, Fusion, Totem, Chrysalis, and Film With Three Dancers.

Reception
Peter Lev described Thanatopsis as the most fascinating and technically accomplished of Emshwiller's early dance films, and a "disturbing contemplation on death." Jenelle Porter thought the film "visually unadorned yet supercharged by vibrating visual effects and [its] soundtrack."

See also
 List of American films of 1962

References

External links
 

American avant-garde and experimental films
1962 short films
1962 films
1960s English-language films
1960s American films